Clarke County High School is a public high school in Berryville, Virginia.
CCHS was ranked 19th on Newsweek's Top 1200 High Schools list in 2006. This used a metric based on the amount of Advanced Placement and International Baccalaureate tests taken by all the students in 2005 divided by the amount of graduating seniors. Its courses cover a wide spectrum of advanced levels including the International Baccalaureate program; dual-enrollment courses with Laurel Ridge Community College and AP courses. Additionally, vocational and technical training courses have been expanded: in addition to Future Farmers of America (FFA) and DECA courses, students may choose from a variety of career and trade fields - including nursing, basic construction, CAD and computer courses, and horticulture.

The school was originally opened in 1920. In 1954, the school moved to 200 Swan Avenue, in the building that today houses Johnson-Williams Middle School. In 1987, CCHS moved again, to 240 Westwood Road. The current high school, at 627 Mosby Boulevard, opened in 2012. Situated on over 50 acres of land, it was built to accommodate future growth, with a planned capacity of over 800 students. It features 22 general classrooms as well as 6 science labs, 2 business labs, 5 technology labs, and a large agricultural lab. In addition, the current building houses a state-of-the-art auditorium, and a gymnasium with a college regulation size basketball court and team support spaces. Following extensive renovations, the former high school building was reopened in 2014 to serve as an elementary school.

The faculty consists of over 50 highly qualified teachers and coaches. The day is split into an eight block a day schedule. It is the only public high school in Clarke County, VA.

In addition to a strong academic curriculum, the school offers many opportunities for students to participate in strong extra-curricular activities.

Extracurriculars

Athletics
CCHS athletic teams continue a strong tradition of athletic success. Supported by the Eagles Athletic Association, the school offers varsity and JV sports in the following arenas:
Football, Golf, Swimming, Boys and Girls Soccer, Basketball, Volleyball, Tennis, Cross Country, Wrestling, Track & Field, Baseball, Softball, and both Sideline and Competition Cheerleading. Many of CCHS' teams and athletes have won championships at the district, regional, and state levels. Clarke County High School is the home of 33 state titles.

DECA: The Distributive Education Clubs of America (DECA) chapter at CCHS provides opportunities for students to sharpen skills in marketing, communication, advertising, and other career fields. The organization maintains a strong presence within the school and community. CCHS members have gone on to win many awards, and several have held state and national officer positions over the years.

FFA: The CCHS FFA chapter also remains a strong and vital club. With Clarke County having its roots in agriculture, the FFA enables students to pursue and develop skills and an understanding of all aspects of modern farming. CCHS FFA students have also been elected to state and national officer positions.

Bands: CCHS supports an award-winning Marching Band, which performs at home football games and
in various parades along with its Color Guard. The Marching Band won at a national level at the Atlantic Coast Championships, under the Tournament of Bands 2A classification, in 2015. There is also an accomplished Concert Band, Jazz Band, Steel Drum Ensemble, Percussion Ensemble, Pit Orchestra, an Indoor Drumline, and a Pep Band that plays for home basketball games.

Choirs: CCHS supports two choirs. These include the Concert Choir and Chamber Choir.

Fine Arts: CCHS supports an Art Club, a yearbook design team, as well as courses that deal with 
a wide variety of art media, photography, and presentations. The Art Club assists in designing and painting set pieces for the annual musicals. The award-winning yearbook staff annually publishes a full-color yearbook on the cutting edge of design trends. Each spring, IB Art students host an art show at the historic Burwell Morgan Mill. The school also supports a National Art Honors Society chapter

Energy and Power/Robotics: CCHS supports a FIRST Robotics Competition team. Each year in March they travel to Richmond to participate in the regional tournament.

Theatre Arts: CCHS supports a Theatre Arts program. In addition to two classes, there are 
several extra-curricular theatre opportunities throughout the year, including the fall play held in November and the spring musical held in March. The school is home to a chapter of the International Thespian Society.

Quiz Bowl: Clarke County is the home to a Scholastic Bowl team that competes in the VHSL Bull Run District. The team was the state runner-up in 2019 and 2021 as well as the 2A State Champion in 2020.

References

External links 
 Clarke County High School

Public high schools in Virginia
International Baccalaureate schools in Virginia
Schools in Clarke County, Virginia